Comic Cuts was a British comic magazine. It was published from 1890 to 1953, lasting for 3006 issues. It was created by the reporter Alfred Harmsworth through his company Amalgamated Press (AP).  In its early days, it inspired other publishers to produce rival comic magazines.  Comic Cuts held the record for the most issues of a British weekly comic for 46 years, until The Dandy overtook it in 1999.

Publication history 
The first issue of Comic Cuts sold 118,864 copies, with circulation growing to around 300,000 soon after.

During its lifetime, the comic merged with many others, including Golden Penny (1928), Jolly Comic (1939), and Larks (1940). Comic Cuts finally disappeared in September 1953 when it was merged with Knockout.

Content 
Its first issue was an assortment of reprints from American publications.

In other media 
The comic is mentioned in G. K. Chesterton's 1905 book Heretics and in the 1910 book Alarms and Discursions, and in a line of Cyril Tawney's song "Chicken on a Raft" — "He's looking at me Comic Cuts again".

It was also mentioned in Clive Dunn's 1971 hit record "Grandad" — "Comic Cuts, all different things."

The character Annie Twohig refers to it in  Lennox Robinson's play  Drama at Inish — "Annie: I'll stay at home and read a magazine." "Constance: Which magazine?" "Annie: Comic Cuts."

References

Sources 
 The first issue of Comic Cuts (1890) in the Internet Archive.

 

1890 establishments in the United Kingdom
1953 disestablishments in the United Kingdom
Comics magazines published in the United Kingdom
Comics before 1900
Fleetway and IPC Comics titles
Magazines established in 1890
Magazines disestablished in 1953
Defunct British comics
British humour comics
1890s comics
1953 comics endings
Magazines published in London
Comics anthologies